Christian Ingrao (born 13 June 1970) is a French historian. He is the research director at CNRS within the Raymond Aron Center for Sociological and Political Studies (CESPRA) of the Ecole des Hautes Etudes en Sciences Sociales in Paris.

A specialist in the history of Nazism and the violence of war, he dedicates himself to the cultural history of Nazi German militancy and practices of violence, particularly on World War II's Eastern Front. He was director of the Institute for the History of the Present Time from 2008 to 2013.

References 
 
 
 
 
 

1970 births
20th-century French historians
21st-century French historians
French military historians
Historians of Germany
Living people
Research directors of the French National Centre for Scientific Research